Sir Sivaswami Kalalaya is a co-educational school and Affiliated to Directorate of school Education, Tamil Nadu located in Mylapore, Chennai, Tamil Nadu, India.

Council Members 

President Sri T.R. Mani, Senior Advocate

Vice-President Sri K.V. Ramanathan, I.A.S. (Retd.)

Honorary-Secretary Dr.Smt. Vathsala Narayanaswami, Retd. Director, Sharmik Vidya Peeth.

Honorary-Joint Secretary & Treasurer Sri V.S. Subramanian, Business.

Ms M.S. Jayasri, M.Com., B.Ed., Principal

Ms Jashoda Sundar, M.A., B.Ed., BEC, Dip. in Geography, Vice Principal

History 

Sir P.S. Sivaswami Ayyar is a great legend in the sphere of education; he gave all that he had to promote, sustain and perpetuate a school for boys at Tirukkattupalli, Thanjavur, and a school for girls at Mylapore- Lady Sivaswami Ayyar Girls' Higher Secondary School. Although how he financed these institutions is well-known, it is worth noting that he gave away his magnificent palatial house to finance the Girls' School at Mylapore and lived in a rented house in the evening years of his life. On 7 February 1989, the National Boys' and Girls' Education Society celebrated the 125th year of his birth in a fitting manner. The Society also decided to set another milestone in his memory by starting a new school - Sir Sivaswami Kalalaya at "Sudharma" the building constructed to commemorate his birth centenary.

Infrastructure and Facilities 
The school has spacious classrooms with smart boards available.
A very big library is also available where students can get various collection of books.
There is a large auditorium available where many cultural activities take place.
Separate laboratories are available for Physics, Chemistry, Biology, All the necessary apparatus are given to the students for practicals.

Art and Craft 

Students are taught drawing, painting, water color techniques, still-life composition and charcoal-based art work. The school has taken the initiative of providing exclusive training to the students in Folk Art, Madhubani and Warli. In fact, it is the only school in Chennai currently, to cater to this segment which is a unique distinction. Moreover, the school also organizes 'craft bazaar' (an art and craft exhibition on a yearly basis) to encourage young artists.

Sports 

The school offers coaching facilities for Karate, Basketball and gives scope for cricket too. The school conducts yearly tournaments for cricket and basketball.

Playground 

The School has a Cement Basket Ball Court and a spacious Playground.Preschool:

The emphasis is on learning through mutual co-operation in a delightful ambience far away from the world of ruthless competition. The thrust is on acquisition of basic concepts and healthy habit formation.

Primary School (Classes I -V) 

The focus shifts to formal education besides a regulated exposure to various creative activities, paving the way for joyful learning.

Middle School (Classes VI-VIII) 

Computer-aided teaching is an integral part of the teaching-learning process. Children are encouraged to glean the latest information using computers.

Secondary School (Classes IX & X) 

Academics becomes the focal point, with continuous practice as the key. Students are geared up for the Board Examination.

Senior Secondary (Classes XI & XII) 

The thrust at this stage is wholly on achievement. The school aims at augmenting students' performance to enable them to secure admission for higher education in elite or prestigious institutions. Thinking, analysis, problem-solving, brainstorming and group discussions are salient features. Science and Commerce streams are offered at this level.

Subjects 

Core English - compulsory subject Group I - Physics, Chemistry, Maths, Biology / Computer Science. Group II - Accountancy, Business Studies, Economics, Mathematics / Informatics Practice / Marketing.

Languages 

The school follows the three-language formula as per the language policy. Students learn 2 languages—English & Hindi or Tamil up to Class IV. The third language is studied from Classes V-VIII and this reverts to a two-language pattern in the secondary school. Only one language needs to be studied at the Senior Secondary level. The students would have to study Hindi as one of the languages in Classes V-VIII.

Primary schools in Tamil Nadu
High schools and secondary schools in Tamil Nadu
Schools in Chennai
Educational institutions established in 1989
1989 establishments in Tamil Nadu